

Life 
Francisco López Capillas (1608 - 1674) was a Mexican composer born in Mexico City. He was born Francisco López, the son of Bartolome López, potentially a royal notary, and María de la Trinidad. He was admitted into the Mexico City Cathedral choir in 1625, where he studied under Antonio Rodriguez Mata. In 1643, López was appointed the assistant organist and dulcian player in the Puebla Cathedral, but left Puebla in 1648 to seek other opportunities. His whereabouts for the next six years are unknown.

In March 1654, he presented a book of his compositions to the authorities of the Mexico City Cathedral. A month later, the chapel's choirmaster, Fabián Ximeno, passed away. Four days later, López took over the role as choirmaster and principal organist. At this point he began signing his name as 'López Capillas' ('López of the Chapels'). He held this position until 1668, when the duties of the organist were separated from the choirmaster. He then held the choirmaster position until his death in 1674.

He is regarded as the first notable composer born in America and the colonies of New Spain. He composed several Baroque masses, motets, and magnificats.

Works

Masses 

 Missa Pange lingua; 6 voices
 Missa super scalam Aretinam; 5 voices (on hexachord)
 Missa Aufer a nobis; 4 voices (on López motet)
 Missa super Alleluia; 5 voices (on López motet)
 Missa Benedicta sit Sancta Trinitas; 4 voices (on Palestrina motet)
 Missa Quam pulchri sunt gressus tui; 4 voices (on Palestrina motet)
 Missa Re Sol; 4 voices (on Riscos' canción)
 Missa batalla; 6 voices (on Janequin chanson)

Motets 

 Adiuva nos, Deus (part I by Antonio Rodriguez Mata)
 Aufer a nobis
 Christus factus est
 Cui luna, sol et omnia
 Cum iucunditate
 Ecce nunc tempus
 Ego enim
 Et incarnatus est
 In horrore visionis nocturnae
 Lumen ad revelationem
 Quicumque coluerit apostolorum
 Tenebrae factae sunt
 Velum templi

Other 

 8 magnificats

References

External links
 

1615 births
1673 deaths
Mexican classical composers
Mexican Baroque composers
Musicians from Mexico City
17th-century classical composers
Mexican male classical composers
17th-century male musicians